Łowkowice  is a village in Kluczbork County in Opole Voivodeship, Poland.

History 
While part of the Prussian Province of Silesia as Lowkowitz, the village was the place of birth and death of the Polish apiarist Jan Dzierżon (1811–1906), the discoverer of parthenogenesis among bees. 

In 1936, Nazi Germany renamed the village Bienendorf (German for "Bee Village") and kept the name until 1945. After Germany's defeat in World War II in 1945, the town was part of the region that became part of Poland under the terms of the Potsdam Agreement. It was then renamed to the traditional Polish name Łowkowice. Poland renamed the nearby town of Rychbach Dzierżoniów in Dzierżon's honor.

References 

http://www.chinci.com/travel/pax/q/3093058/%C5%81owkowice/PL/Poland/0/

Villages in Kluczbork County